Sparaxis grandiflora, the plain harlequin flower, is a species of flowering plant in the genus Sparaxis, family Iridaceae, found in the Western Cape province of South Africa. It has gained the Royal Horticultural Society's Award of Garden Merit.

Subspecies
Sparaxis grandiflora subsp. grandiflora
Sparaxis grandiflora subsp. acutiloba Goldblatt
Sparaxis grandiflora subsp. fimbriata (Lam.) Goldblatt
Sparaxis grandiflora subsp. violacea (Eckl.) Goldblatt

References

grandiflora
Endemic flora of South Africa
Flora of the Cape Provinces
Plants described in 1804